Bulubadiangan Island (variously Bulobadiangan island or Bulubadiangan Islet) is a privately owned island in northeastern Iloilo, Philippines. It is part of barangay Polopińa, Concepcion. The Sandbar Island Beach Resort on Bulubadiangan is moderately known within the Philippines.

Location and geography 

Bulubadiangan Island is east of Panay Island in the Visayan Sea. Part of the Concepcion Islands, it is a small island off the end of Igbon Island. It is connected to Danao-Danao Island by a small reef. Although privately owned, Bulubadiangan is part of the Polopińa barangay, which has a population of 3,419 according to the 2010 census.

Places of interest 

The main feature of Bulubadiangan is its  sandbar, which is exposed at low tide. The sandbar is a popular destination for tourists visiting Concepcion.

Resorts:

1. Sandbar Beach Resort

2. Villa Manuela Island Resort

See also 

 List of islands in the Philippines

References

External links
 
 Bulubadiangan Island at OpenStreetMap

Islands of Iloilo
Private islands of the Philippines